Andrés Molteni and Marco Trungelliti were the defending champions but decided not to participate.
Pavol Červenák and Matteo Viola defeated Guilherme Clezar and Gastão Elias 6–2, 4–6, [10–6] in the final to win the title.

Seeds

Draw

Draw

References
 Main Draw

Campeonato Internacional de Tenis de Santos - Doubles
2013 Doubles